Melana Chasmata is the second full-length album by Swiss extreme metal band Triptykon, released through Prowling Death Records /Century Media Records on 14 April 2014 in Europe and on 15 April 2014 in North America. The album was officially announced on 22 October 2013 by the band's frontman, Thomas Gabriel Fischer (a.k.a. "Tom Warrior"), on his official blog.

The title is in Greek (Μελανά Χάσματα) and, according to Fischer, it can be roughly translated as "black, deep depressions/valleys" — or, more literally, "chasms as [black as] ink".

The album's artwork was provided by famous Surrealist painter H. R. Giger. It is the third time in his career he has collaborated with Thomas Fischer; Giger also provided artwork for Fischer's former band Celtic Frost's first full-length, To Mega Therion, in 1985, and to Triptykon's debut Eparistera Daimones in 2010. It was Giger's last album cover before his death, just one month after the album's release.

A music video for the track "Aurorae" was released on 7 August 2014. Another video, to "Tree of Suffocating Souls", was released on 17 November 2014. Song In The Sleep of Death is referring to Emily Brontë as about a lost love.

Track listing 
The album's official track listing was unveiled by Tom Warrior on his official blog on 7 February 2014. A teaser 7" single containing the tracks "Breathing" and "Boleskine House" was released on 17 March 2014.

Reception 
Melana Chasmata was met with universal acclaim by both critics and band fans. Writing for All About the Rock, Rich Dodgin said: "The music of Melana Chasmata combines heaviness and gothic sensibility to create a fantastically nightmarish soundscape, and if you're a fan of dark ambient music you will love this". MetalSucks also praised the album, giving it five stars out of five. It also scored a perfect five out of five on MetalUnderground.com, whose reviewer, Oliver Hynes, stated that "Melana Chasmata is more than just a metal album... It's art". Exclaim! was also positive about the album and rated it an 8 out of 10, calling it "an impressive continuation of Tom G. Warrior's often-mighty lineage, addressing each and every one of his strengths while offering something new for those unaware of the history embedded in every note". Pitchfork Media were slightly less impressed with the album and gave it a 7.7 out of 10, with reviewer Andy O'Connor stating: "Melana Chasmata is the follow-up [to Eparistera Daimones], and while it retains much of the strength of its predecessor, it doesn't quite feel like the triumph Triptykon's debut did". Melana Chasmata was placed as number two on Rolling Stone's 20 Best Metal Albums of 2014. It was voted as "Album of the Year 2014" by the editorial staff of Dutch webzine Lords of Metal.

Commercial performance 
The album debuted at No. 171 on the Billboard 200 and at No. 11 in the Hard Rock Albums chart, with 2,950 copies sold in its debut week in the U.S.

Charts

Personnel 

 Thomas Gabriel Fischer – guitar, vocals
 V. Santura – guitar, vocals
 Norman Lonhard – drums, percussion
 Vanja Šlajh – bass, backing vocals

 Additional musicians
 Simone Vollenweider – additional vocals (track 2 and 9)
 Michael Zech – guitar (track 6)
 A. Acanthus Gristle – additional vocals (track 8)

 Miscellaneous staff
 Thomas Gabriel Fischer, V. Santura – production
 V. Santura – mastering
 H. R. Giger – cover art "Mordor VII"

References

External links 
 Triptykon's official website
 Tom Fischer's official blog

2014 albums
Triptykon albums
Century Media Records albums
Albums with cover art by H. R. Giger